Lucas Joas Gomes Leite (born November 3, 1982) is a Brazilian grappler. He is a multi-time world champion with first place finishes at the Gi, Nogi, and Grapplers Quest world championships. Leite started training Brazilian Jiu-jitsu when he was 12 years old under Ryan Gracie.  He earned his black belt under Leo Vieira in 2006.

Lucas is noted for having a dynamic half guard game utilizing a twisting knee-hip pressure that is difficult to stop. He says he likes to attack through half guard because it is effective in both gi and no gi competition.  Though a natural lightweight, Leite mostly competes at heavyweight or absolute because he often practices with heavier training partners at his gym. Leite moved from Brazil to California in 2007 and opened his own jiu-jitsu academy, where he currently teaches full-time.  Leite's students include UFC fighter Jessica Penne.  He is a member of Checkmat BJJ Academy. Leite won the Pan American Championships in the under 94 kg division in 2015.

See also
List of Brazilian Jiu-Jitsu practitioners

References

External links
http://www.lucasleitebjj.com/
http://www.bjjheroes.com/bjj-fighters/lucas-leite
http://www.budovideos.com/blogs/budo-blog/16712099-some-half-guard-a-little-tornado-guard-and-an-epic-mohawk

Living people
1982 births
Brazilian practitioners of Brazilian jiu-jitsu
Sportspeople from São Paulo (state)
People awarded a black belt in Brazilian jiu-jitsu
World No-Gi Brazilian Jiu-Jitsu Championship medalists